Elbert E. Foules Jr.  is a former professional American football cornerback who played five seasons for the Philadelphia Eagles in the National Football League.  Foules was inducted to the Alcorn State University Sports Hall of Fame in November 2013.

References

1961 births
Living people
Sportspeople from Greenville, Mississippi
American football cornerbacks
Alcorn State Braves football players
Philadelphia Eagles players